Periodic elections for the Tasmanian Legislative Council were held on 6 May 2006. The two seats up for election were Rowallan, held by independent MLC Greg Hall, and Wellington, held by Labor MLC Doug Parkinson. Rowallan was last contested in 2001, while Wellington was last contested in 2000.

Rowallan
Rowallan had been held since 2001 by independent MLC Greg Hall. His sole opponent was Karen Cassidy of the Tasmanian Greens.

Wellington
Labor MLC Doug Parkinson first entered the Legislative Council as the member for Hobart in 1994. He successfully transferred to Wellington in 2000. In the leadup to the election there was speculation that the Tasmanian Greens were close to winning the seat; their candidate was Marrette Corby. The other candidates all appeared on the ballot as independents. Michael Fracalossi was a member of the Christian Democratic Party. Marti Zucco was a Hobart City Council alderman. The other independents were Stephen Roomes and Paul Hiscutt.

References

2006 elections in Australia
Elections in Tasmania
2000s in Tasmania
May 2006 events in Australia
Tasmanian Legislative Council